Chuzi (708–698 BC), also sometimes called Duke Chu of Qin, was from 703 to 698 BC the ninth ruler of the state of Qin during the Zhou dynasty in ancient China.  His ancestral name was Ying (嬴), and Chuzi was his posthumous name.  He was the first of two child rulers of Qin called Chuzi.

Biography
Chuzi's father was Duke Xian of Qin, who died in 704 BC at the age of 21.  Chuzi was the youngest of Duke Xian's three sons, and his mother was Wang Ji (王姬).  His older half-brother, later known as Duke Wu of Qin, was the crown prince.  Duke Wu and his younger brother, later known as Duke De of Qin, were both born to Duke Xian's main wife Lu Ji (鲁姬).  After Duke Xian died, however, the ministers Fuji (弗忌) and Sanfu (三父) deposed the crown prince and installed five-year-old Chuzi on the throne.  Six years later, in 698 BC Sanfu and Fuji assassinated Chuzi and put Duke Wu, the original crown prince, on the throne.  Duke Wu later executed Sanfu and Fuji for the crime of murdering Chuzi.

References

Rulers of Qin
8th-century BC Chinese monarchs
7th-century BC Chinese monarchs
698 BC deaths
Child monarchs from Asia
708 BC births
7th-century BC murdered monarchs
Assassinated Chinese politicians